, also known as simply Capcom vs. SNK in international releases, is a 2000 head-to-head fighting game produced by Capcom originally released as a coin-operated arcade game for Segas NAOMI hardware and later ported to the Dreamcast. It is the second game in the SNK vs. Capcom series and the first game in the series to be released for the arcade.

The sequel, Capcom vs. SNK 2, featuring tweaked gameplay and more characters, was released the following year.

Gameplay
Capcom vs. SNK uses a "ratio" system, where the "ratio" is a rating of a character's overall strength, ranging from 1 to 4. Teams of up to four can be assembled, but their combined ratios must equal and go no higher than 4. The gameplay uses the SNK-style four-button format. The player can also choose their "groove", or attack meter. The SNK Groove is based on the Extra mode that was used from The King of Fighters '94 to The King of Fighters '98, while the Capcom Groove is based on the gameplay system from the Street Fighter Alpha series.

Plot

Prologue 
In 2000, a special martial arts event is planned through a collaboration of the two most powerful world organizations: the Garcia Financial Clique and the Masters Foundation. The gala event – it is hoped by everyone – will ease the political conflicts between the two powers. The competition was named "Millennium Fight 2000".

Many renowned martial artists have registered for the tournament. People around the world focus intensely on the upcoming exhibitions, making the long-awaited opening ceremony a huge success.

Playable characters

Capcom characters

SNK characters

Notes

Versions
An updated version of the original Capcom vs. SNK titled Capcom vs. SNK Pro was released on the Arcade Sega NAOMI GD-ROM hardware (2000), Dreamcast (2001) and PlayStation (2002), the latter suffering from slight load times between rounds and downgraded graphics and sound due to hardware limitations. New additions included Joe Higashi (from Fatal Fury) and Dan Hibiki (from Street Fighter Alpha), new moves for existing characters, and new modes of play. Capcom vs. SNK Pro was only ported to the Dreamcast in Japan, while the PlayStation port was made available internationally.

Reception

Metacritic, which assigns a normalised rating in the 0–100 range, calculated an average score of 80 out of 100 ("Favorable") for the Dreamcast version, and 74 out of 100 ("Average") for the PlayStation version's Pro edition.

In Japan, Game Machine listed Capcom vs. SNK: Millennium Fight 2000 on their October 1, 2000 issue as being the most successful arcade game of the week. Famitsu also gave the former console version and its Pro edition a same score (30 out of 40).

Capcom vs. SNK received mixed to positive reviews. Chet Barber reviewed the Dreamcast version of the game for Next Generation, rating it three stars out of five, and stated that "Although there are many unique ideas here, Capcom vs. SNK simply lacks ambition.  Capcom and its newly acquired developers from SNK need to sit down and once again revolutionize this genre." The Dreamcast version won GameSpots annual "Best Fighting Game" award among console games. and The Arcade version was a runner-up for "Best Head-to-Head Arcade Fighting Game" by Monthly Arcadia, but lost to Guilty Gear X. The sequel would later Nominated for GameSpots annual "Best Fighting Game" awards in the next year, losing to Garou: Mark of the Wolves,

References

External links
Capcom vs. SNK: Millennium Fight 2000 at the official Japanese website of Capcom
Capcom vs. SNK: Millennium Fight 2000 Pro at the official Japanese website of Capcom
Capcom vs. SNK: Millennium Fight 2000 Pro (PlayStation) at the official Japanese website of Capcom

J-pop.com review

2000 video games
Arcade video games
Capcom games
Crossover fighting games
Dreamcast games
Fighting games
2D fighting games
PlayStation (console) games
SNK vs. Capcom
Video games developed in Japan
Video games set in Arizona
Video games set in Japan
Video games set in New York City
Video games set in Spain
Video games set in Thailand
Virgin Interactive games